Lake Erie College is a private liberal arts college in Painesville, Ohio. Founded in 1856 as a female seminary, the college converted to a coeducational institution in 1985. As of the 2016–2017 academic year, the total enrollment was 1,177 students.

In addition to 63 programs of study for undergraduate students, Lake Erie offers master's programs in education and physician assistant studies, as well as the IACBE-accredited Parker Master of Business Administration program, first founded in 1981.

Campus

Students can rely on their own transportation or the Lake County Laketran bus system that has stops near the campus.  Parking one personal vehicle on campus is available upon registering with the college.

History

Lake Erie Female Seminary 
Founded as the Lake Erie Female Seminary in 1856, the institution toppled the belief that women were not capable of significant intellectual improvement. The only single-sex institution of higher education for women in the Western Reserve, it took after its sister seminary, Mount Holyoke.

The seminary was relocated in Painesville after Willoughby Seminary, founded in 1847, burned to the ground. Its founders include prominent local citizens Timothy Rockwell, general store owner Silas Trumbull Ladd, Judge William Lee Perkins, Mayor and Judge Aaron Wilcox, Charles Austin Avery and Judge Reuben Hitchcock, a president of the Cleveland and Mahoning Railroad and cousin of Edward Hitchcock.

Scholarship was not a chief concern at the Seminary in its earliest years, however. Educating future mothers through domestic work, physical education and etiquette ranked among the Seminary's chief aims. For a tuition of $160, seminarians trained as teachers.

Over 40 years, the seminary raised standards, finally delivering a college degree. It took on the official name of Lake Erie College in 1908 when a charter was passed.

Expansion 
The Arts took up a home in the halls of Lake Erie. Helen Rockwell Morley Memorial Music Building, opened in 1927, still shines – its classic Greek design, Corinthian pillars, seating for more than 1,000, and four-manual E.M. Skinner organ with 5,000 pipes.

The Civil Aeronautics Authority approved Lake Erie for a civilian pilot program in 1939, several years after Amelia Earhart visited the campus to speak to its Aviators Club.

In the 1940s, President Dr. Helen D. Bragdon, a Harvard alumna, moved the college from more Victorian ideals toward an active, responsible citizenry. Her successor, Dr. Paul Weaver, initiated a required general studies lecture series to demonstrate the interconnectivity of fields of study, three 10 week terms, and the establishment of study centers in many European cities.

In 1954, Lake Erie College became the first institution of higher education in the United States to require a term abroad for its students.

In 1967, Lake Erie added a School of Equine Studies to its equestrian riding program developed by Laddie Andahazy, an influential horseman who founded the Cleveland Grand Prix.

A special exhibit of Modern art signaled the opening of Royce Hall for the Fine and Performing Arts in 1970. Prints, sculpture, graphics and more by celebrated artists such as Dali, dekooning, Magritte, Miro and Picasso were on display. R. Buckminster Fuller spoke at the facility's ground-breaking.

In 1985, Lake Erie College became coeducational, merging Garfield Senior College with Lake Erie College for Women, and men were admitted officially as students.

Presidents

Academics 
Lake Erie College houses five academic schools: the School of Business, the School of Arts, Humanities, and Social Sciences, the School of Natural Sciences and Mathematics, the School of Education and Professional Studies, and the School of Equine Studies. Each maintains its own majors, minors, and programs under the direction of its respective dean. All students complete a general curriculum, called CORE, as a foundation to courses required by their major field(s) of study.

School of Business 
The IACBE-accredited School of Business offers its students ten undergraduate majors and six minors.

Center for Entrepreneurship 
Lake Erie College is a member of the Entrepreneurship Education Consortium and its programming integrates entrepreneurship concepts and collaborative retreats and competitions such as ideaLabs and Entrepreneurship Immersion Week into traditional academic studies. Its Center for Entrepreneurship consists of business faculty and a resident entrepreneur.

School of Arts, Humanities & Social Sciences 
The School of Arts and Humanities offers its students 13 undergraduate majors and 16 minors. Some popular majors include criminal justice, psychology, communication and English. Minors such as gender, sexuality & women's studies as well as comedy studies fall outside the scope of major fields of study. While most major fields lead to a Bachelor of Arts degree, a Bachelor of Fine Arts degree is also offered.

School of Natural Sciences and Mathematics 
The School of Natural Sciences and Mathematics offers its students four majors. Students have access to regional land preserves due to the School's partnership with The Nature Conservancy.

School of Education and Professional Studies 
In addition to three undergraduate programs, the School of Education and Professional Studies also offers endorsements in TESOL and reading, post-baccalaureate programming, and an M.Ed. degree.

School of Equine Studies 
The School of Equine Studies offers its students four majors.

Equestrian riding 
Lake Erie College's equestrian riding teams compete throughout the calendar year in English and Western events, including the IHSA Hunt Seat Team, IHSA Western Team, and IDA Dressage Team. The college hosts shows, clinics and events, most notably the annual Prix de Villes, at its George M. Humphrey Equestrian Center.

Athletics

The Lake Erie athletic teams are called the Storm. The college is a member of the Division II level of the National Collegiate Athletic Association (NCAA), primarily competing in the Great Midwest Athletic Conference (G-MAC) since the 2017–18 academic year. The Storm previously competed as a member of the Great Lakes Intercollegiate Athletic Conference (GLIAC) from 2010–11 to 2016–17; as well as an NCAA D-II Independent from 2008–09 to 2009–10. Prior joining to NCAA Division II, the Storm competed as a member of the Allegheny Mountain Collegiate Conference (AMCC) of the NCAA Division III ranks from 1997–98 to 2007–08 (when it completed the process of moving to Division II at the conclusion of the 2008–09 academic year).

Lake Erie competes in 19 intercollegiate varsity sports: Men's sports include baseball, basketball, cross country, football, golf, lacrosse, soccer, track & field and wrestling; while women's sports include basketball, cross country, golf, lacrosse, soccer, softball, track & field and volleyball.

About
The official nickname of the college's athletics teams is the Storm. The name was chosen to replace the nickname Unicorns when the college added men's intercollegiate athletics beginning in 1988. Their mascot is Stormy.

A newly heated rivalry has begun with Ashland University, a two-hour drive away in Ashland, Ohio.

Lake Erie College sponsored the first women's national collegiate tennis tournament in 1922, won by Evelyn Ennes of Sandusky, Ohio.

Notable alumni 
 Valerie Curtin, film and television actress
 Migdalia Cruz, writer
 Carol Dunlop, writer translator
 Emma Gillett, lawyer and women's rights activist
Deborah Goodrich, film and television actress
 Elizabeth Bartlett Grannis, suffragist, editor, social reformer
Anthony Kukwa, professional football player
 Mary Elizabeth McCracken, medical missionary
 Dawn Powell, author and playwright
 Luke Raley, professional baseball player
 Ryan Rua, professional baseball player
 Elizabeth Terry, chef
 Louise Treadwell Tracy, advocate for the deaf, wife of Spencer Tracy
 Caroline Ransom Williams, Egyptologist and classical archaeologist

Notable faculty 
 Amy Kelly, historian and author

References

External links

 
Former women's universities and colleges in the United States
Education in Lake County, Ohio
Liberal arts colleges in Ohio
Private universities and colleges in Ohio
Educational institutions established in 1856
Buildings and structures in Lake County, Ohio
1856 establishments in Ohio